Douglas is an unincorporated community in Calhoun County, West Virginia, United States.

See also 
Douglas, Tucker County, West Virginia

References 

Unincorporated communities in West Virginia
Unincorporated communities in Calhoun County, West Virginia